Isabel Cruz (aka  Isabel F. Cruz, Maria Isabel Cruz) (died 2021) was an American Portuguese computer scientist known for her research on databases, knowledge representation, geographic information systems, AI, visual languages, graph drawing, user interfaces, multimedia, information retrieval, and security. She was a University of Illinois Chicago Distinguished Professor and a Professor Computer Science in the College of Engineering at the University of Illinois Chicago. She was a Fellow of the American Association for the Advancement of Science.

Life 
Cruz completed a MS (1987) and PhD (1993) in computer science at the University of Toronto advised by Alberto O. Mendelzon.  She conducted her postdoctoral research at Brown University advised by Paris Kanellakis. She was the recipient of a National Science Foundation CAREER Award in 1996. Cruz joined the University of Illinois Chicago College of Engineering in 2001. She was elected Fellow of the American Association for the Advancement of Science in 2019 and was appointed UIC Distinguished Professor in 2020. Cruz's research focused on databases, big data, geographic information systems, Semantic Web, and knowledge representation.

Recognition
Fellow of the American Association for the Advancement of Science, elected "for her distinguished contributions to visual query languages, information integration and visualization, geospatial computing and for professional leadership in the data management community".  

University of Illinois Chicago Distinguished Professor

University of Illinois Faculty Scholar Award

University of Illinois Chicago Great Cities Institute Faculty Scholar Award

University of Illinois Chicago College of Engineering Faculty Research Award

University of Illinois Chicago Teaching Recognition Program Award

Association for Computing Machinery Recognition of Service Award

National Science Foundation CAREER Award

See also 

 Women in computing

References

External links

Year of birth missing
2021 deaths
Fellows of the American Association for the Advancement of Science
University of Illinois Chicago faculty
Portuguese women computer scientists
21st-century Portuguese scientists
21st-century women scientists
Portuguese emigrants to the United States
Portuguese expatriates in Canada
University of Toronto alumni